Margarita Percovich (born 21 January 1941) is an Uruguayan politician. She is a member of the Senate of Uruguay and one of the founders of Frente Amplio.

References

1941 births
Living people
Uruguayan people of Croatian descent
Broad Front (Uruguay) politicians
Uruguay Assembly politicians
Founders
Women founders
Political party founders